Enzo Matteucci (20 December 1933 in Ancona, Italy – 3 July 1992 from ALS) was an Italian professional football player and coach.

1933 births
1992 deaths
Neurological disease deaths in Marche
Deaths from motor neuron disease
Italian footballers
Serie A players
A.S. Sambenedettese players
Inter Milan players
S.P.A.L. players
A.S. Roma players
U.C. Sampdoria players
Casale F.B.C. players
Italian football managers
Brescia Calcio managers
Association football goalkeepers